Smashing Through is a 1929 British silent adventure film directed by W. P. Kellino and starring John Stuart, Eve Gray and Hayford Hobbs. It was made at Lime Grove Studios in Shepherd's Bush.

Cast
 John Stuart as Richard Bristol 
 Eve Gray as Kitty Masters 
 Hayford Hobbs as James Masters, her brother 
 Julie Suedo as Miss Duprez 
 Sandy McKenzie as Mr. Sergius 
 Alf Goddard as Alf, a mechanic 
 Mike Johnson as His mate 
 Gladys Hamer as Ethyl 
 Charles Ashton as Westlake 
 Harold Saxon-Snell as Driver

References

Bibliography
 Low, Rachael. History of the British Film, 1918–1929. George Allen & Unwin, 1971.

External links

1929 films
1929 adventure films
British silent feature films
British adventure films
1920s English-language films
Films directed by W. P. Kellino
Films shot at Lime Grove Studios
British black-and-white films
1920s British films
Silent adventure films